Tianweitania sediminis is a bacterium from the genus of Tianweitania which has been isolated from terrestrial sediments from the Mohe Basin in China.

References

External links
Type strain of Tianweitania sediminis at BacDive -  the Bacterial Diversity Metadatabase

Phyllobacteriaceae
Bacteria described in 2016